Freedoms New Zealand, also known as Freedoms NZ: Uniting Political Parties and Freedom Movements is a registered political alliance in New Zealand founded on 22 August 2022 following a series of protests led by Brian Tamaki. It is an "umbrella party", consisting of an alliance between the New Nation Party, Freedom and Rights Coalition, and Vision NZ.

Formation
Formed as an "umbrella of hope", Tamaki announced the party on 22 August 2022 during the "People's court" protest in Wellington.

The party's goals according to Tamaki would be to address the cost of living crisis, health, gang crime, as well as the shared goal of seeing “the political establishment cleaned out”.

Tamaki announced that the party consists of the Vision NZ Party, the New Nation Party, and the NZ Outdoors & Freedom Party, however the latter responded that Tamaki had "jumped the gun" and that they "requested time to discuss the issues together". Outdoors and Freedom Party president Alan Simmonds would later express his concerns of being "labelled a totally freedom nutter party", and ultimately they never joined Freedoms New Zealand. 

Tamaki also encouraged other politicians and parties, including the New Conservative Party, New Zealand First, and newly independent MP Gaurav Sharma to consider joining the coalition. The Freedoms & Rights Coalition issued a statement expressing interest for the participation of several additional parties, including Matt King's Democracy NZ, Heartland New Zealand Party, ONE Party, Social Credit Party, Sustainable New Zealand Party, The Opportunities Party, and the New Zealand TEA Party. None of these groups joined Freedoms New Zealand.

The party applied for registration on 28 November. Registration was approved on 16 February 2023.

Reactions
Christopher Luxon, Leader of the National Party, did not formally rule out working with the party. However, Luxon stated he doubted the party would enter parliament. Luxon told reporters to "read between the lines", stating that National had little in common with the party. Grant Robertson of the Labour Party would later criticise Luxon for failing to give a clear statement on National's position on the party.

David Seymour, the leader of ACT New Zealand ruled out collaboration with Freedoms NZ. Seymour stated "I don't think that you could have a serious conversation with people who hold a show trial for crimes against humanity". Seymour expressed his sadness over the overshadowing of individuals who had grievances with the government's handling of the pandemic with those who had ran show trials.

The Green Party's Marama Davidson stated that "it is far too dangerous to be able to even consider working" with the party considering their "violent agenda" and "exploitation of people".

References

2022 establishments in New Zealand
Political parties established in 2022
Political parties in New Zealand
Far-right politics in New Zealand